Heorhiy Oleksiyovych Klimov (born 7 June 2000) is a Ukrainian professional footballer who plays as a goalkeeper for Ukrainian club Hirnyk-Sport Horishni Plavni.

References

External links
 
 

2000 births
Living people
Footballers from Kyiv
Ukrainian footballers
Association football goalkeepers
FC Kolos Kovalivka players
FC Hirnyk-Sport Horishni Plavni players
Ukrainian First League players